Shadrack Kipchirchir (born February 22, 1989) is a Kenyan-born American distance track and field Olympian specializing in the 10,000 m. Following in his brothers footsteps, Kipchirchir enlisted in the U.S. Army in October 2014 and joined the U.S. Army World Class Athlete Program after his enlistment.

He is a silver medalist at the 2014 NCAA Outdoor Championships in the 10,000 meters and placed second in the 2016 U.S. Olympic Trials - Track & Field 10,000 m. He ran 27:58.32 and finished 19th for the 2016 Summer Olympics 8th in 3000 meters at the 2018 World Championships.

Early life and college
Kipchirchir had no experience running competitively until he moved to the United States, but earned All-America honors at Western Kentucky and Oklahoma State University where he studied Construction engineering to become an Engineer.

Professional
Kipchirchir joined the U.S. Army World Class Athlete Program after his enlistment in 2014.

Shadrack Kipchirchir finished 4th in the Athletics at the 2015 Pan American Games – Men's 10,000 metres.

On 22 August 2015, Shadrack finished 16th in the 2015 World Championships in Athletics – Men's 10,000 metres for United States at the 2015 World Championships in Athletics.

Kipchirchir ran a season best time 27:58.32 at Athletics at the 2016 Summer Olympics – Men's 10,000 metres to place 19th.

On August 4, Kipchirchir finished ninth in a personal best time of 27:07.55 in the 10 km at the 2017 World Championships in Athletics – Men's 10,000 metres.

Kipchirchir has been sponsored by Nike since 2017 and trains in Colorado with American Distance Project.

In March 2018, Kipchirchir finished 8th in the prelim of the 3000 meters at the 2018 World Championships.

2015
Shadrack Kipchirchir finished 4th in the 10,000 meters at the 2015 USA Outdoor Track and Field Championships to qualify for the 2015 World Championships in Athletics – Men's 10,000 metres.

Kipchirchir finished 3rd in 34:37 in the 2015 USATF 12 km road championships .US National 12K in Alexandria, Virginia.

2016
Kipchirchir finished second in 44:40 in the Gate River Run 2016 USATF 15 km championships March 2016 in Jacksonville, Florida.

Kipchirchir finished in second place in the 10,000 meters race at the Stanford Invitational in 27:58.91 in April 2016 in Stanford, California.  More important than the victory is the time was under the qualification standard for the 2016 Olympics.

At the 2016 US Olympic Trials, Kipchirchir finished in second place behind Galen Rupp to represent Team USA at Athletics at the 2016 Summer Olympics – Men's 10,000 metres.

Kipchirchir finished in second place behind Ryan Hill at USATF 5 km Championships hosted by CVS Health Downtown 5k in Providence, Rhode Island in a time of 13:58.

2017
On February 4, Kipchirchir finished 3rd in 30:18.6 in the 2017 USATF cross country 10 km championships in Bend, Oregon.

On March 11, Kipchirchir finished second in 43:23 by less than a second to Leonard Korir in the Gate River Run 2017 USATF 15 km road championships in Jacksonville, Florida.

On June 22, Kipchirchir finished second in 29:01.68 by a second to Hassan Mead at 2017 USA Outdoor Track and Field Championships in the 10 km.

On July 4, Kipchirchir finished second in 28:17 by a second to Leonard Korir in the Peachtree Road Race 2017 USATF road 10 km championships in Atlanta Georgia.

On August 4, Kipchirchir finished ninth in a personal best time of 27:07.55 in the 10 km at the 2017 World Championships in Athletics – Men's 10,000 metres.

On October 1, Kipchirchir finished first in 47:33 to win by less than a second in front of Leonard Korir in the Medtronic TC 10 Mile 2017 USATF road 10 mile championships in St Paul-Minneapolis.

On November 4, Kipchirchir finished first in 13:57 to win by less than a second in front of Tommy Curtin, Kirubel Erassa, and Paul Chelimo in the Abbott Dash to the Finish Line 5K 2017 USATF road 5 km championships in New York, New York.

2018
On February 3, Kipchirchir won the 3 km at the Millrose Games in a season best time 7:45.49.

On February 17, Kipchirchir finished second in 7:58.42 by a second to Paul Chelimo in the 3 km at the 2018 USA Indoor Track and Field Championships and finished 4th in the 1500 meters in a time of 3:43.31.

On June 21, Kipchirchir finished second in 28:59.67 by a second to Lopez Lomong in the 10 km at the 2018 USA Outdoor Track and Field Championships.

References

External links

Living people
1989 births
People from Rift Valley Province
Track and field athletes from Oklahoma
Kenyan emigrants to the United States
Kenyan male long-distance runners
American male long-distance runners
American male marathon runners
Athletes (track and field) at the 2015 Pan American Games
World Athletics Championships athletes for the United States
Athletes (track and field) at the 2016 Summer Olympics
Olympic track and field athletes of the United States
Pan American Games track and field athletes for the United States
U.S. Army World Class Athlete Program